The 1998 Giro di Lombardia was the 92nd edition of the Giro di Lombardia cycle race and was held on 17 October 1998. The race started in Varese and finished in Bergamo. The race was won by Oscar Camenzind of the Mapei team.

General classification

References

1998
Giro di Lombardia
Giro di Lombardia
Giro Di Lombardia
October 1998 sports events in Europe